Joaquín Blanco Albalat (born 25 June 1989) is a Spanish competitive sailor. He competed at the 2016 Summer Olympics in Rio de Janeiro, in the men's Laser class.

He is the son of Olympic sailor Joaquín Blanco Roca.

References

External links
 
 
 

1989 births
Living people
Spanish male sailors (sport)
Olympic sailors of Spain
Sailors at the 2016 Summer Olympics – Laser
Mediterranean Games gold medalists for Spain
Mediterranean Games medalists in sailing
Competitors at the 2018 Mediterranean Games